The Chittagong Hill Tracts Development Board was a government agency established in 1978 by the then-President of Bangladesh Ziaur Rahman in response to the rise of the Shanti Bahini insurgency in the Chittagong Hill Tracts of eastern Bangladesh. Currently Nikhil Kumar Chakma, is the Chairman of this development board.

History
Headed by an army general, the board was formed to provide special attention and administer the issues of the Chittagong Hill Tracts conflict. The board was formed in 1976 through the Chittagong Hill Tracts Development Board Ordinance.

The first chairman from civil administration is Bir Bahadur Ushwi Sing, an MP of Bangladesh Parliament who was elected from Bandarban constituency and the current State Minister, Ministry of Chittagong Hill Tracts Affairs. He was appointed in 1996. Later in 2002 Wadud Bhuiyan, the former member of the parliament from Khagrachari constituency, was appointed as chairman of Chittagong Hill Tracts Development Board. In 2009, Bir Bahadur was appointed again as the chairman of this agency. Afterwards Naba Bikram Kishore Tripura was the chairman of the board in 2013 and served till 2021.

References

External links

Chittagong Division
Government agencies of Bangladesh
Chittagong Hill Tracts conflict
History of Chittagong Division
Chittagong Hills Tracts
Chittagong Hills Tracts
Chittagong Hills Tracts
1976 establishments in Bangladesh